Six Mile Island is a nature preserve in Louisville, Kentucky located on the Ohio River.

About
The Office of Kentucky Nature Preserves owns and manages the preserve and was dedicated June 24, 1979. The reserve is an undeveloped riverine island and is known for its extensive variety of waterbirds. Even though the preserve has a variety of birds, not many people visit the island as the only access is by boat. The island received its name Six Mile Island for its distance from the Falls of the Ohio much like Fourteen Mile Creek and Twelve Mile Island also located along the Ohio river.

The Great Steamboat Race during the Kentucky Derby Festival turns around at Six Mile Island as the halfway marker during the race.

External links
 Office of Kentucky Nature Preserves

References

Nature reserves in Kentucky
River islands of Kentucky
Islands of the Ohio River
Protected areas established in 1979
Protected areas of Jefferson County, Kentucky
Landforms of Louisville, Kentucky